Pihlajisto (Finnish), Rönninge (Swedish) is a northern-central quarter in Helsinki, the capital of Finland. It is part of the Malmi neighbourhood.

Neighbourhoods of Helsinki